Beloyarsky District is an administrative district (raion), one of the thirty in Sverdlovsk Oblast, Russia. Its administrative center is the urban locality (a work settlement) of Beloyarsky. Population: 39,374 (2010 Census);  The population of the administrative center accounts for 32.0% of the district's total population.

Administrative and municipal status
Within the framework of administrative divisions, Beloyarsky District is one of the thirty in the oblast. The work settlement of Beloyarsky serves as its administrative center.

As a municipal division, the territory of the district is split between two municipal formations—Beloyarsky Urban Okrug, to which the work settlement of Beloyarsky and forty-four of the administrative district's rural localities belong, and Verkhneye Dubrovo Urban Okrug, which covers the rest of the administrative district's territory, including the work settlement of Verkhneye Dubrovo.

References

Notes

Sources

Districts of Sverdlovsk Oblast
